Upper Thurne Broads and Marshes is a  biological Site of Special Scientific Interest north of Great Yarmouth in Norfolk. Part of it is a Nature Conservation Review site, Grade I, and it is in the Norfolk Coast Area of Outstanding Natural Beauty. It is part of the Broadland Ramsar site and Special Protection Area, and The Broads Special Area of Conservation. Two areas, Hickling Broad and Martham Broad, are national nature reserves managed by the Norfolk Wildlife Trust.

This is one of the finest wetland complexes in Britain, and it is internationally important for its wetland plant communities and associated animal species. It has four lakes, Hickling Broad, Heigham Sound, Horsey Mere and Martham Broad, together with smaller water bodies, swamp, fen, woodland and grazing marsh.

References

Sites of Special Scientific Interest in Norfolk
National nature reserves in England
Nature Conservation Review sites
Ramsar sites in England
Special Protection Areas in England
Special Areas of Conservation in England
Hickling, Norfolk